Baseball at the 2005 Southeast Asian Games was held at the Rizal Memorial Sports Complex in Manila, Philippines. Baseball will not be played in the 2012 Olympic Games. However, in 2006, the World Baseball Classic was held, and it will be staged in 2009 and four years after. Baseball traditionally is not a SEA Games official sport event but was added this edition of the SEA Games due to its popularity among the host country. This is one of the events exclusively for men.

Medal winners

Details

External links
Southeast Asian Games Official Results

2005 Southeast Asian Games events
Southeast Asian Games
2005
International baseball competitions hosted by the Philippines